Seiichi Ishii (石井 精一 Ishii Seiichi, born 18 August 1967) is a Japanese game designer. He is best known for the development of fighting games.

Ishii was born in Ichinomiya City, Aichi Prefecture, Japan. He was a designer on groundbreaking Sega titles Virtua Racing and Virtua Fighter. Ishii was also a designer and director for the first Tekken game in 1994 and Tekken 2 in 1995. He established his own company, DreamFactory Co., Ltd. in November 1995, through Sega Enterprises Ltd. and Namco Ltd., expanding his fighting game pedigree to create titles such as Tobal No. 1, Ehrgeiz, and The Bouncer.

Games developed

External links

1967 births
Living people
Japanese video game designers
People from Aichi Prefecture